The Lacey M-10 is an American homebuilt aircraft that was designed to use simple construction techniques.

Design and development
The Lacey M-10 was designed to have a minimum of rigging required for construction. The strutless, flat bottomed wing omits features such as washout, compound curves, dihedral and angle of incidence. Other than ailerons, the simple wing does not use flaps, leading edge slots or any other lift devices.

The M-10 is a cantilevered, high wing, conventional landing gear-equipped aircraft that seats two in tandem. The all-wood wing is able to pivot 90 degrees for trailering or storage. The pivot works by removing four bolts, using a jack to raise the wing a few inches for pivoting, then lowering the wing again, reattaching the bolts in the same pattern. The controls are mounted overhead. The front and rear occupant each have an individual door for entry on either side.

Although only two M-10s have been built, the simple construction of the flat-winged M-10 has resulted in it becoming a popular design for model aircraft competition.

Operational history
In September 2014 at least one M-10 was still on the American Federal Aviation Administration aircraft registry.

Variants
M-10
Initial model powered by a single Continental C-90 engine.
M-10C
A twin engine variant powered by two Volkswagen air-cooled engines on nose mounted pylons designed by Joseph Lacey and R. G. Muggins. The cabin can be converted into a sleeper for one person.

Specifications (M-10)

See also

References

Homebuilt aircraft